Ogün is a Turkish given name for males. People named Ogün include:

Ogün Altıparmak, Turkish footballer
Ogün Samast, Turkish ultra-nationalist
Ogün Sanlısoy, Turkish rock musician
Ogün Temizkanoğlu, Turkish footballer
Ogün Aksu, mechanical engineering 

Turkish masculine given names